Oswald Tötsch (born 17 January 1964) is an Italian former alpine skier who competed in the 1984 Winter Olympics and 1988 Winter Olympics.

References

External links
 

1964 births
Living people
Italian male alpine skiers
Olympic alpine skiers of Italy
Alpine skiers at the 1984 Winter Olympics
Alpine skiers at the 1988 Winter Olympics
Sportspeople from Sterzing
Germanophone Italian people
Alpine skiers of Centro Sportivo Carabinieri